"Boulevard of Broken Songs" (also known as "Wonderwall of Broken Songs" or "Wonderwall of Broken Dreams") is a popular mash-up mixed by American DJ and producer Party Ben in late 2004. The mix consists of elements from American pop punk band Green Day's "Boulevard of Broken Dreams", English Britpop band Oasis's "Wonderwall", Scottish soft rock band Travis's "Writing to Reach You", and American rapper Eminem's "Sing for the Moment", which itself samples American hard rock band Aerosmith's "Dream On". "Sing for the Moment" was used solely because Party Ben did not have "Dream On" on hand and was on deadline for his Sixx Mixx radio show. Later versions (see below) used Aerosmith's original.

Appearances in other media 
The mash-up first appeared as the finale of Party Ben's Sixx Mixx radio show on LIVE 105 on Friday, October 1, 2004. It was posted as a standalone mp3 on his website a few days later. The track began receiving radio airplay and was eventually aired on hundreds of radio stations worldwide despite having no official release. It eventually landed on many stations' lists of the most-played tracks of 2004 and 2005.

A new version of the mash-up was later created with "Dream On" instead of "Sing for the Moment" and was included on the compilation album The Best Mashups in the World Ever Are from San Francisco. A third version that samples the Aerosmith song and vocals by American rapper Missy Elliott from a remix of American pop singer Madonna's "American Life" was included on American Edit, a full-length mash-up album of American Idiot, produced by Party Ben and Team9 under the name "Dean Gray", which is a spoonerism of "Green Day".

Reception
Vice said that the song's "beauty (...) lies in its universality", and noted it as an early example of material becoming viral.

Party Ben reported having reached an agreement with "record label executives" such that all radio plays of the mashup would count as plays of the original, and that this led to the original charting a second time.

Personnel
 Green Day (all versions)
Billie Joe Armstrong – lead vocals, guitar
 Mike Dirnt – bass guitar
 Tré Cool – drums
 Oasis (all versions)
Liam Gallagher – lead vocals
 Noel Gallagher – acoustic bass and electric guitars, piano
 Paul Arthurs – acoustic guitar, mellotron
 Alan White – drums
 Travis (all versions)
Fran Healy – backing vocals, guitar
 Andy Dunlop – guitar
 Dougie Payne – bass guitar
 Neil Primrose – drums
 Aerosmith (all versions except the original)
Steven Tyler – backing vocals
 Joe Perry  – guitar
 Brad Whitford – rhythm guitar
 Tom Hamilton – bass guitar
 Joey Kramer – drums
 Eminem – backing vocals, rapping (original version only)
Missy Elliott – vocals (American Edit version only)

References

External links
Party Ben Information Systems (official site)
San Francisco Chronicle article on Boulevard of Broken Songs
Boulevard of Broken Songs flash video

2004 songs
Mashup songs
Green Day
Oasis (band)
Travis (band)
Aerosmith
Eminem
Missy Elliott
Songs written by Billie Joe Armstrong
Songs written by Mike Dirnt
Songs written by Tré Cool
Songs written by Noel Gallagher
Songs written by Fran Healy (musician)
Songs written by Eminem
Songs written by Jeff Bass
Songs written by Luis Resto (musician)
Songs written by Steven Tyler